The Human Rights Measurement Initiative finds that Gabon is fulfilling 62.2% of what it should be fulfilling for the right to health based on its level of income. When looking at the right to health with respect to children, Gabon achieves 84.7% of what is expected based on its current income. In regards to the right to health amongst the adult population, the country achieves only 78.1% of what is expected based on the nation's level of income. Gabon falls into the "very bad" category when evaluating the right to reproductive health because the nation is fulfilling only 23.9% of what the nation is expected to achieve based on the resources (income) it has available.

Hospitals
There were 542 medical facilities in Gabon in 2019.  Government and other notable hospitals are listed below.

`

Health status

Life expectancy 
In 2014, the CIA estimated the average life expectancy in Gabon was 52.06 years.

Maternal and child healthcare
The 2010 maternal mortality rate per 100,000 births for Gabon is 260. This is compared with 493.5 in 2008 and 422.5 in 1990. The under 5 mortality rate, per 1,000 births is 71 and the neonatal mortality as a percentage of under 5's mortality is 36. In Gabon the number of midwives per 1,000 live births is 12 and the lifetime risk of death for pregnant women 1 in 110.

Ten percent of all births were low birth weight.

HIV/AIDS
The HIV/AIDS prevalence is estimated to be 5.2% of the adult population (ages 15–49). As of 2009, approximately 46,000 people were living with HIV/AIDS. There were an estimated 2,400 deaths from AIDS in 2009 – down from 3,000 deaths in 2003.

References

External links
 The State of the World's Midwifery - Gabon Country Profile